Občan Brych is a 1958 Czechoslovak film directed by Otakar Vávra. The film starred Josef Kemr.

References

External links
 

1958 films
Czechoslovak drama films
1950s Czech-language films
Films directed by Otakar Vávra
Czech drama films
1950s Czech films